Karolina Pęk is a Polish para table tennis player who plays in international level events. She is a European multi-medalist and has won team events along with Katarzyna Marszal and Natalia Partyka.

References

Living people
People from Tarnobrzeg
Sportspeople from Kraków
Paralympic table tennis players of Poland
Table tennis players at the 2012 Summer Paralympics
Table tennis players at the 2016 Summer Paralympics
Table tennis players at the 2020 Summer Paralympics
Medalists at the 2012 Summer Paralympics
Medalists at the 2016 Summer Paralympics
Medalists at the 2020 Summer Paralympics
Year of birth missing (living people)
Paralympic medalists in table tennis
Paralympic gold medalists for Poland
Paralympic bronze medalists for Poland
Polish female table tennis players